Laurence David Lafore (born Laurence Davis Lafore, 1917, Narberth, Pennsylvania-November 24, 1985, Iowa City, Iowa) was an American historian.

Background
Lafore was born into a wealthy family off the Main Line of Philadelphia, Pennsylvania. The Lafore family was a Huguenot family that fled France following the revocation of the Edict of Nantes.  The family fled first to England and then to North America, landing in 1701.

The Lafores of Pennsylvania were relatively distinguished and Lafore followed his father and grandfather in leading a Philadelphia charity called the "Société des Bienfaisances Françaises," which was founded in the late 18th century to aid the aristocratic refugees fleeing the Reign of Terror of the French Revolution.  It was the original intent of Marie Antoinette or her supporters that she would make her way to Philadelphia and build a new life there.

Lafore graduated from Swarthmore College and the Fletcher School of Law and Diplomacy at Tufts University.

One of Lafore's brothers, John A. Lafore, Jr., was a United States congressman from Pennsylvania and a president of the American Kennel Club.

World War II
For a short period during the post-war reconstruction period, Lafore worked for the American State Department in Paris, France.  He later spoke of the contrast between the superficial luxury of the palace where they had their offices and the freezing conditions, which required personnel to wear overcoats indoors.

Academic career
Lafore joined the faculty at Swarthmore College in 1946 and taught there until 1969.  In that year he joined the history faculty at the University of Iowa, where he taught until his retirement in May 1984.

Publications

History
While Lafore published informally in numerous outlets, including TV Guide, he is best known for three works of history:  The Long Fuse (1965), about the origins of World War I; The End Of Glory (1970), about the origins of World War II; and Days Of Emperor and Clown: The Italo-Ethiopian War, 1935-1936 (1973).

Historic preservation
Lafore's friendship with fellow Swarthmore professor Sarah Lee Lippincott resulted in their 1965 book Philadelphia: The Unexpected City.  He later wrote the 1975 book American Classic about his adopted city of Iowa City, Iowa.

Lafore is buried at West Laurel Hill Cemetery in Bala Cynwyd, Pennsylvania.

1917 births
1985 deaths
Swarthmore College faculty
20th-century American historians
20th-century American male writers
American male non-fiction writers